Cécile Lignot-Maubert (née Lignot; born 19 November 1971 in Bastia, Corsica) is a retired female hammer thrower from France. She set her personal best (65.39 metres) on 8 August 1999 at a meet in Castres.

She won the French female Hammer Throw Championships three times: in 1994, 1997 and 1999.

She set the  French Hammer record four times, hurling respectively 58.60m, 59.74m and 63.88m in 1997, then 64.15m in 1998.

Prize List 

French Athletic Championships :
 3 times winner of female Hammer Throw in 1994, 1997 and 1999.

Achievements

References
 
 cdm.athle.com

1971 births
Living people
French female hammer throwers
People from Bastia
Sportspeople from Bastia
20th-century French women